Montesano is a city in Grays Harbor County, Washington, United States. The population was 4,138 at the 2020 census. It is the county seat of Grays Harbor County.

History

Medcalf Prairie
According to Edwin Van Syckle, a portion of the present-day town of Montesano was first platted in 1870 by Samuel Henry Williams, who purchased land in what was known as Medcalf Prairie, named after the early settler William Medcalf. At about the same time, surveyor Charles Newton Byles bought a farm from Walter King on the present-day site of Montesano on April 9, 1870, and later platted three blocks on the west side of Main Street. The town of Montesano was born, but it was not incorporated until November 26, 1883, by the Washington Territorial Legislature.

South Montesano
Prior to that time, the name Montesano was used to refer to the homestead of Isaiah Lancaster Scammon and his wife Lorinda. They filed a 640-acre Donation Land Claim on January 15, 1853, on the Chehalis River, opposite the mouth of the Wynoochee River, in the area now referred to as South Montesano. The Scammon home was often referred to as "Scammon's Landing" or "Scammon's Hotel", because it was an important stopping point along the Chehalis River for early pioneers, and the furthest up-river mooring point and railroad junction for seagoing ships.

According to Edmond S. Meany, in 1860 the seat of what was then called Chehalis County was moved to "the place of J.L. Scammons". Mrs. Lorinda Scammon was very religious and wished to have the place named "Mount Zion". Another early settler, Samuel James, suggested "Montesano", which was derived from Spanish meaning "mountain of health"; it was said that this had a more pleasant sound and meant about the same. The suggestion was approved, and soon after, a post office was secured with the name "Montesano". The people of Chehalis County voted to move the county seat to the platted town of Montesano in 1886, and the Scammon home was then known as South Montesano.

Recent
In 2012, a man calling himself Michael Thomas entered the county courthouse where he struggled with a deputy sheriff, shooting her in the shoulder with her own gun.  He also stabbed in the neck a judge trying to assist the deputy.  Later identified as Steven Daniel Kravetz, the assailant was convicted on assault charges and acquitted of attempted murder.

Geography
Montesano is located at  (46.985865, -123.597726). It is on the north slope of the Chehalis River valley, near the confluence of the Wynoochee River and Chehalis River. The town is bordered on the north by Lake Sylvia and on the west by Sylvia Creek.

Climate
This region experiences warm (but not hot) and relatively dry summers, with no average monthly temperatures above  and very wet autumns and springs due to the maritime winds. According to the Köppen Climate Classification system, Montesano is in a region of oceanic climate, abbreviated Cfb on climate maps due to frequent summer rainfall, even though there is a significant drying trend during that season. The summer highs are hotter than in Aberdeen courtesy of its inland position. This also renders frequent but most often minor frosts in winter, with the climate retaining a significant maritime influence.

Demographics

2010 census
As of the census of 2010, there were 3,976 people, 1,563 households, and 1,031 families residing in the city. The racial makeup of the city was 80.3% White, 0.4% African American, 5% Native American, 0.10% Asian, 0.2% Pacific Islander, 0.6% from other races, and 3.4% from two or more races. Hispanic or Latino of any race were 9.8% of the population.

Of the 1,563 households, 31.0% had children under the age of 18 living with them, 48.6% were married couples living together, 11.7% had a female householder with no husband present, 5.7% had a male householder with no wife present, and 34.0% were non-families. 27.8% of all households were made up of individuals, and 10.8% had someone living alone who was 65 years of age or older. The average household size was 2.39 and the average family size was 2.88.

The median age in the city was 41.4 years. 21.9% of residents were under the age of 18; 8.3% were between the ages of 18–24; 25.1% were from 25–44; 28.4% were from 45–64; and 16.3% were 65 years of age or older. The gender makeup of the city was 49.2% male and 50.8% female.

2000 census
As of the census of 2000, there were 3,312 people, 1,326 households, and 879 families residing in the city. The population density was 320.4 people per square mile (123.7/km2). There were 1,408 housing units at an average density of 136.2 per square mile (52.6/km2). The racial makeup of the city was 94.99% White, 0.12% African American, 1.87% Native American, 0.48% Asian, 0.06% Pacific Islander, 0.18% from other races, and 2.29% from two or more races. Hispanic or Latino of any race were 1.84% of the population.

Of the 1,326 households, 30.9% had children under the age of 18 living with them, 51.4% were married couples living together, 10.5% had a female householder with no husband present, and 33.7% were non-families. 28.4% of all households were made up of individuals, and 13.5% had someone living alone who was 65 years of age or older. The average household size was 2.38 and the average family size was 2.92.

In the city, the population was spread out, with 23.8% under the age of 18, 8.5% from 18–24, 28.7% from 25–44, 23.6% from 45–64, and 15.4% who were 65 years of age or older. The median age was 39 years. For every 100 females, there were 99.4 males. For every 100 females age 18 and over, there were 96.2 males.

The median income for a household in the city was $40,204, and the median income for a family was $42,344. Males had a median income of $41,500 versus $30,096 for females. The per capita income for the city was $19,467. About 9.3% of families and 11.6% of the population were below the poverty line, including 12.4% of those under age 18 and 10.7% of those aged 65 or over.

Attractions

County courthouse

A prominent feature of the town is the 1911 Grays Harbor County Courthouse. This is a three-story structure with a domed tower. The interior features murals of local history. Not to be missed is the dent in the front door made by the sheriff as he fired at a fleeing felon. The motto "come on vacation and leave on probation" was coined for this Grays Harbor County city.

Lake Sylvia
In the northern part of the town is Lake Sylvia State Park.

Southern Olympics
Wynooche Valley Road, the road north from Montesano which follows the course of the Wynoochee River, is the access way to the southern Olympic Mountains and the southern quarter of Olympic National Park.

Festival of Lights
The annual Festival of Lights is a winter holiday event that has been celebrated for 22 years. The highlight of the weekend is the Grand Parade.

Festivities include tours of decorated historic homes, a lighting contest, arts and crafts show, a children's play zone, food vendors, the jingle bell jog, a scavenger hunt, storytelling, tours of the county courthouse and murals, and a pancake breakfast. Other activities include the Yule Log lighting, chowder feed, and caroling.

Notable residents
 Reuben Hollis Fleet (March 6, 1887 – October 29, 1975), born and raised in Montesano, was an American aviation pioneer, businessman and army officer. As a major in the Army Air Services, Fleet organized the first Airmail Service for the U.S. Post Office which was between Washington, D.C., Philadelphia and New York City. Fleet founded, among other companies, Consolidated Aircraft. Consolidated Aircraft is well known for the PBY Catalina flying boat and the B-24 Liberator bomber. During World War II the citizens of Montesano purchased war bonds to pay for a B-24 named the Spirit of Montesano. In August 1946, Fleet and his sister, Lillian, bought a parcel of land in Montesano and donated it to the city for Fleet Park, named in honor of their parents. The city subsequently renamed Second Street to Fleet Street in their honor.
 Robert "Bob" Gaston Moch (June 20, 1914 – January 18, 2005), born and raised in Montesano, was the coxswain of the University of Washington varsity eight-man shell won the gold medal in the 1936 Summer Olympics in Berlin by defeating the favored teams from Germany and Italy in front of Adolf Hitler.
 Kurt Cobain (February 20, 1967 – April 5, 1994), Nirvana lead singer and guitarist, moved to Montesano as a child with his father, following the divorce of his parents in 1976. Cobain was shuttled between relatives until 1983 when he moved back to his mother's home in Aberdeen, Washington, the city where he was born, during his sophomore year of high school.
 Jerry Lambert (born August 8, 1957), raised in Montesano and graduated from Montesano high school, is a stage, film, and television actor and voiceover artist, best known for his work on the ABC sitcom, Sons and Daughters, as well as commercials for companies including GEICO, Holiday Inn, Bridgestone, and playing a fictional Sony executive for the PlayStation brand named Kevin Butler.
 Adam Bighill (born October 16, 1988), a graduate of Montesano High School and Central Washington University, is an American and Canadian football player for the BC Lions (2011–2016), the New Orleans Saints (2017) and the Winnipeg Blue Bombers (2018 to present). He is a three-time Grey Cup champion (2011, 2019, 2021), a three-time CFL Most Outstanding Defensive Player (2015, 2018, 2021) and a six-time CFL All-Star (2013, 2015, 2016, 2018, 2021). 
 Fran Polsfoot (April 9, 1928-April 5, 1985), a graduate of Montesano High School and Washington St. University, was an American football NFL end for the Chicago Cardinals (1950-1952) and the Washington Redskins (1953). He played in the Pro Bowl following the 1951 season. He was later an NFL receivers coach for four different teams (1962-1984).
 Blanche Pennick (1905 - 1991), Washington State legislator (1945 to 1947) and educator.
 The band Melvins was formed in Montesano in 1983. Founding members Buzz Osborne, Matt Lukin and Mike Dillard all attended Montesano High School.

See also
 Lake Sylvia State Park

References

External links

Cities in Grays Harbor County, Washington
Cities in Washington (state)
County seats in Washington (state)